The Eureka Council Inc. is an Australian organisation dedicated to the social, cultural, and heritage needs of Colonial and Anzac Australians. It promotes national pride, preservation of heritage and history, and Australian arts.

History
The Eureka Council was conceived in 1998 and registered in January 2003. It is an incorporated association or government-registered non-profit group.

Native Australian culture
Australia and its non-indigenous inhabitants (Australians) are made up of many nationalities, many of which came to Australia during several major periods of its history. The most recognisable of these periods in the convict period of the late 18th and early 19th centuries, where many nationalities such as the English, Irish and Scottish, were transported to Australia as punishment for their crimes, or as free settlers in order to start the new nation. Other such periods of migration from overseas includes the gold rushes of the 1850s, where many Europeans and Chinese made their way to Australia in order to seek their fortunes.

Many modern day Australians do not know their heritage - for these Australians, Australia's Colonial Heritage is the only heritage or identity they can relate to. For this reason, that heritage must be treasured and preserved as a matter of urgency. Colonial Australians are strongly and completely at home in current Australia but they do have a number of special needs. These are not financial or social needs, but because they do not enjoy the cross-cultural enrichment that multicultural Australians enjoy, our Colonial Australians need our Australian Colonial and Anzac heritage and culture to be preserved and protected. This is the only heritage or culture these Australians will ever have.

Activities
Most recently, the Eureka Council has been involved in the fight to save a national treasure from property developers. Rose Cottage and the Australian Pioneer Village in Hawkesbury, NSW is currently being threatened by a local council resolution to sell the artefacts contained in the village. A rally was held on the 28 June 2009, with an expected attendance of 1000 people - over 5000 people attended on the day which is a clear indication of the level of support from the general public. The Eureka Council Executive has petitioned the local council using 'moral-force' persuasion, a style used by John Basson Humffray who headed up the Ballarat Reform League during the Eureka Stockade rebellion of 1854. Through this 'moral-force' approach, it is expected the decision will be reviewed and overturned by the local council.

Currently, the Eureka Council, through their Victorian Representative, is working with the Hepburn Shire Council  on several gold history related projects. The Hepburn Shire Council encompasses the area to the north of Ballarat including the towns of Creswick, Clunes, Daylesford and Trentham. All these towns have a rich gold history with Clunes, Victoria taking the claim of being the place where gold was first discovered in Victoria. The projects involve such initiatives as storyboards at the New Australasian Mine No. 2 shaft, the scene of Australia's worst gold mining accident where in early December 1882, 22 men lost their lives when water broke through to where they were working from an adjacent mine. Other projects include creating a gold trail linking Geelong, Ballarat, Creswick, Clunes and Bendigo, as well as restoring the quartz crushing battery in Creswick.

Historical significance
The Eureka Council web site is indexed as "a site of cultural and historical significance"  by the National Library of Australia, in Canberra.

References

External links
 Official website

Australian culture